CapMan Oyj, founded in 1989 and headquartered in Helsinki, Finland, is a Finnish private equity fund manager listed in Helsinki Stock Exchange. CapMan manages funds with capital raised mainly from European institutional investors, such as pension funds and insurance companies, endowments, family offices, funds of funds and public institutions. CapMan has three key investment areas – Private Equity, Real Estate and Infrastructure. Altogether, CapMan employs around 160 professionals in Helsinki, Stockholm, Copenhagen, Oslo, Luxembourg and London.

History

In 2014, during CapMan's 25th anniversary, a book called "Into the driver's seat - Stories about entrepreneurs and CapMan" was written by journalist Marko Erola from Talouselämä magazine.

Investment areas
CapMan has three key investment areas - Private Equity, Real Estate, and Infrastructure - each of which has its own dedicated investment teams and funds.

 Private Equity includes CapMan Buyout, which invests in unlisted Nordic mid-market companies in various industries; CapMan Growth, which makes minority investments in Nordic growth companies; and CapMan Credit, which invests in private debt.
 Real Estate manages private equity real estate funds and mandates, which invest in office, retail, residential and hotel properties, in the Nordic countries.
 Infra invests in Nordic mid-cap infrastructure assets, focusing on energy, transportation and telecom assets.

Investments
Targets for CapMan's investment partnerships are mainly Nordic and Russian unlisted companies and Nordic real estate.

In December 2012, CapMan became a signatory of the UN Principles for Responsible Investment (UN PRI).

CapMan has investments in dozens of different companies, amongst others Cederroth, Esperi Care, Design-Talo, Lumene, Kämp Group, The North Alliance, Walki, Komas Ltd, LämpöLux and Havator Group.

CapMan has over Euro 3 billion of capital under management.

Ownership
More than half of CapMan is owned by Finnish institutions and households. Approximately one fifth is owned by management and personnel, and the rest of the owners are foreign and nominee shareholders. Management and personnel hold half of the voting rights. The biggest owners of CapMan include Belgian private equity and venture capital firm GIMV NV, Ilmarinen Mutual Pension Insurance Company, and personally and through their businesses, Ari Tolppanen, Olli Liitola, Tuomo Raasio ja Heikki Westerlund, also employed by CapMan. Further, the ten biggest owners include Varma Mutual Pension Insurance Company and The State Pension Fund.

References

Financial services companies established in 1989
Economy of Finland
Finnish companies established in 1989
Companies listed on Nasdaq Helsinki